Morchella spongiola is a species of fungus in the family Morchellaceae. It was first described scientifically by Jean Louis Émile Boudier in 1897.

References

External links

Morchellaceae
Edible fungi
Fungi of Europe
Fungi described in 1897